The 2020 season was Djurgårdens IF's 120th in existence, their 65th season in Allsvenskan and their 20th consecutive season in the league. In addition to the, Allsvenskan, they will compete in the 2019–20 and 2020–21 editions of the Svenska Cupen and the Champions League where they entered at the first qualifying round.

Djurgården entered the league season as defending champions having won their 12th league title, and the first in 14 years, on the final day of the 2019 season.

Squad

Out on loan

Competitions

Allsvenskan

League table

Results summary

Results by round

Matches

2019–20 Svenska Cupen

Group stage

Matches

2020–21 Svenska Cupen

Matches

2020–21 Champions League

2020–21 Europa League

Statistics

Appearances

Goalscorers 

The list is sorted by shirt number when total goals are equal.

Hat-tricks

Own goals

Clean sheets
The list is sorted by shirt number when total clean sheets are equal.

References

Djurgårdens IF Fotboll seasons
Djurgårdens IF season